The NCAA Division I FBS field goal leaders are career, single-season, and single-game leaders in field goal kicking. These lists are dominated by more recent players for several reasons:
 Since 1955, seasons have increased from 10 games to 11 and then 12 games in length.
 The NCAA didn't allow freshmen to play varsity football until 1972 (with the exception of the World War II years), allowing players to have four-year careers.
 Bowl games only began counting toward single-season and career statistics in 2002. Players who have played since then often have an extra game each year to accumulate statistics.
 In recent decades, starting with the Southeastern Conference in 1992, FBS conferences have introduced their own championship games, which have always counted fully toward single-season and career statistics.
 The NCAA ruled that the 2020 season, heavily disrupted by COVID-19, would not count against the athletic eligibility of any football player. This gave every player active in that season the opportunity for five years of eligibility instead of the normal four.

Only seasons in which a team was considered to be a part of the Football Bowl Subdivision are included in these lists. In particular, Cole Tracy kicked 97 field goals across his career, which would be tied for the career record, but 68 of them were at Division III Assumption, and only 29 in the FBS. All records are current through the end of the 2022 season.

References and notes

Football Bowl Subdivision Records, p. 53. Retrieved 2013-01-05.
Career Leaders and Records for Field Goals Made. Retrieved 2013-01-06.

Field goal leaders